Deutsche Zeitung in Norwegen was an Oslo-based daily newspaper published in Norway during the Second World War. It was published by the subsidiary Europa-Verlag of the Nazi-controlled Franz Eher Nachfolger, and had a circulation of about 40,000 copies. The paper served as a model for the Amsterdam-based Deutsche Zeitung in den Niederlanden.

An appreciable difference between Deutsche Zeitung in Norwegen and Deutsche Zeitung in den Niederlanden was their divergent readership; the former was predominantly read by German soldiers in Norway, whilst the latter chiefly had a civilian readership. A competing newspaper in Norway was the Wacht im Norden, that was distributed free of charge to soldiers. Towards the end of 1940, it was decided to establish an offshoot of the paper in Tromsø. Due to a lack of competent editors from Germany, the Tromsø paper was not established before February 1941. It was withal merged with Lappland-Kurier upon Finland's truce with the Soviet Union in September 1944.

According to publisher Max Amann, the editors of Deutsche Zeitung in Norwegen enjoyed more editorial freedom than the editors of newspapers in Nazi Germany. Oron Hale writes, however, that on a closer examination, the dissimilarities between the Norwegian paper and the German ones were small. Until June 1940, the Deutsche Zeitung in Norwegen was subject of military censorship by the German propaganda department in Norway. The newspaper and its offshoots were discontinued on the cease-fire in Europe on 8 May 1945.

References

Bibliography

External links
 Historical Newspapers, Germany, 13 June 2014

Newspapers established in 1940
1940 establishments in Norway
Publications disestablished in 1945
Nazi newspapers
Defunct newspapers published in Norway
Newspapers published in Oslo
Norway in World War II
Propaganda newspapers and magazines
Daily newspapers published in Norway
German-language newspapers published in Europe
Fascist newspapers and magazines